Pine Town (formerly Old Town) is an unincorporated community in Lassen County, California.

References

Unincorporated communities in California
Unincorporated communities in Lassen County, California